István Bóka (born 12 January 1964) is a Hungarian politician, member of the National Assembly (MP) for Balatonfüred (Veszprém County Constituency II) between 1998 and 2014. He served as chairman of the Committee on Local Government and Regional Development from 2002 to 2003. He is the mayor of Balatonfüred, since 2002.

Personal life
He is married and has two children.

References

1964 births
Living people
Fidesz politicians
Members of the National Assembly of Hungary (1998–2002)
Members of the National Assembly of Hungary (2002–2006)
Members of the National Assembly of Hungary (2006–2010)
Members of the National Assembly of Hungary (2010–2014)
Mayors of places in Hungary
People from Veszprém